Ebene is a suburb of Quatre Bornes, Mauritius,  south of the capital, Port Louis. Construction began in November 2001, with the suburb being promoted as a new information technology hub for Mauritius and as a link between African and Asian markets. The aim being to create a hi-tech office area in order to dynamise the country. As a result, it is also referred to as Ebene Cybercity or Cyber City.

Ebene Cyber City 
Mauritius Research and Innovation Council has a centre at Ebene where it has a ground station for its satellite MIR-SAT1. Mauritius Metro is being expanded to Ebene.

Atal Bihari Vajpayee Tower 
The Atal Bihari Vajpayee Tower (formerly Cyber Tower One) is a 12-storey, 72-metre-tall commercial building located in Ebene Cybercity. The blue glass and grey stone building has been awarded the “Intelligent Building of the Year” by the Intelligent Community Forum (ICF), USA in 2005. 

Completed in a period of 18 months, the tower is a fully air-conditioned building with a surface area of 42,275 square metres. India's prime minister Manmohan Singh inaugurated the Ebene Cyber Tower One in 2005. Ebene Cyber Tower hosts the AFRINIC, the Internet registry for Africa. Initially named Cyber Tower One, since 16 January 2019 the tower bears the name of Atal Bihari Vajpayee. 

In the year 2000, the foundation of a strategic partnership between Mauritius and India in the ICT sector was laid between the then Prime Minister of Mauritius and Atal Bihari Vajpayee during his visit to Mauritius. A line of credit of 100 million dollars was signed for the setting up of the first state-of-the-art ICT infrastructure in Mauritius.

Currently, the Cyber City is home to more than 350 companies, employing more than 30,000 people.

References

Further reading
 
 
 
 

 
Populated places in Mauritius
Commercial buildings completed in 2005
Skyscraper office buildings in Mauritius

fr:Cybertour d'Ébène